Yasmina is a 1927 French silent film directed by André Hugon and starring Camille Bert, Huguette Duflos and Léon Mathot.

Cast
 Camille Bert as Afsen  
 Huguette Duflos as Yasmina  
 Léon Mathot as Docteur Hector Grandier  
 Thérèse Kolb as Athima, la nourrice  
 Habib Benglia as Le gardien du sérail 
 Alexiane 
 Simone d'A-Lal 
 Jaime Devesa as Kaïs, l'arabe  
 Madeleine Martellet as Kamra

References

Bibliography
 Goble, Alan. The Complete Index to Literary Sources in Film. Walter de Gruyter, 1999.

External links

1927 films
Films directed by André Hugon
French silent feature films
1927 drama films
French drama films
French black-and-white films
Silent drama films
1920s French films